The 2018–19 Belmont Bruins men's basketball team represented Belmont University during the 2018–19 NCAA Division I men's basketball season. The Bruins, led by 33rd-year head coach Rick Byrd, played their home games at the Curb Event Center in Nashville, Tennessee as members of the Ohio Valley Conference. They finished the season 27–6, 16–2 in OVC play to finish in a tie for the regular season championship with Murray State. They defeated Austin Peay in the semifinals of the Ohio Valley tournament before losing to Murray State in the finals. They received an at-large bid to the NCAA tournament, their first ever at-large bid, where they defeated Temple in the First Four before losing in the first round to Maryland.

On April 1, 2019, head coach Rick Byrd announced his retirement. He finished at Belmont with a 33-year record of 713–347.

Previous season
The Bruins finished the 2017–18 season 24–9, 15–3 in OVC play to finish in second place. They defeated Austin Peay in the semifinals of the OVC tournament to advance to the championship game where they lost to Murray State. Despite having 24 wins, they did not participate in a postseason tournament.

Roster

Schedule and results

|-
!colspan=9 style=| Regular season

|-
!colspan=9 style=| Ohio Valley regular season

|-
!colspan=9 style="|Ohio Valley Conference tournament

|-
!colspan=9 style="|NCAA tournament

Source

References

Belmont Bruins men's basketball seasons
Belmont
Belmont